Crambus xonorus is a moth in the family Crambidae. It was described by Stanisław Błeszyński in 1963. It is found in the Democratic Republic of the Congo.

References

Crambini
Moths described in 1963
Moths of Africa